The 1992 Western Michigan Broncos football team represented Western Michigan University in the Mid-American Conference (MAC) during the 1992 NCAA Division I-A football season.  In their sixth season under head coach Al Molde, the Broncos compiled a 7–3–1 record (6–3 against MAC opponents), finished in second place in the MAC, and outscored their opponents, 197 to 177.  The team played its home games at Waldo Stadium in Kalamazoo, Michigan.

The team's statistical leaders included Brad Tayles with 2,462 passing yards, Jim Vackaro with 893 rushing yards, and Ulric King with 732 receiving yards.

Schedule

References

Western Michigan
Western Michigan Broncos football seasons
Western Michigan Broncos football